The P30 is a regional road in Latvia. The road connects Cēsis via Vecpiebalga with Madona and has a length of 85,7 kilometer. In Bērzkrogs the road has a connection with the A2 to Pskov and Riga.

References 

Roads in Latvia